T-complex protein Ring Complex (TRiC), otherwise known as Chaperonin Containing TCP-1 (CCT), is a multiprotein complex and the chaperonin of eukaryotic cells. Like the bacterial GroEL, the TRiC complex aids in the folding of ~10% of the proteome, and actin and tubulin are some of its best known substrates. TRiC is an example of a biological machine that folds substrates within the central cavity of its barrel-like assembly using the energy from ATP hydrolysis.

Subunits 
The human TRiC complex is formed by two rings containing 8 similar but non-identical subunits, each with molecular weights of ~60 kDa. The two rings are stacked in an asymmetrical fashion, forming a barrel-like structure with a molecular weight of ~1 MDa.

Molecular weight of human subunits.

Counterclockwise from the exterior, each ring is made of the subunits in the following order: 6-8-7-5-2-4-1-3.

Evolution 

The CCT evolved from the archaeal thermosome ~2Gya, with the two subunits diversifying into multiple units. The CCT changed from having one type of subunit, to having two, three, five, and finally eight types.

See also 
Chaperone
Chaperonin
Heat shock protein

Notes

References 

Molecular biology
Gene expression
Protein complexes